Lucas Maximiliano Meza (born 10 March 1992) is an Argentine footballer who plays as a centre-back for Deportes Iquique.

References

External links

1992 births
Living people
Argentine footballers
Argentine expatriate footballers
Association football defenders
Boca Juniors footballers
UAI Urquiza players
Municipal Pérez Zeledón footballers
Correcaminos UAT footballers
A.D. San Carlos footballers
San Telmo footballers
Deportes Iquique footballers
Primera B Metropolitana players
Liga FPD players
Ascenso MX players
Ecuadorian Serie B players
Argentine expatriate sportspeople in Costa Rica
Argentine expatriate sportspeople in Mexico
Argentine expatriate sportspeople in Ecuador
Argentine expatriate sportspeople in Chile
Expatriate footballers in Costa Rica
Expatriate footballers in Mexico
Expatriate footballers in Ecuador
Expatriate footballers in Chile
Footballers from Buenos Aires